The National Police of Panama is a civilian governmental body associated with the Panamanian Public Forces. Established by the National Police Act No. 18 of June 3, 1997, it is responsible for maintaining public order nationwide. The National Police, together with the National Air Service (SENAN), National Border Service, Institutional Protection Service and National Migration Service, make up the public forces.  Since 2010, the National Police has reported to the President through the Minister of Public Security.

The National Police of Panama telephone hotline number is 104 and is free of charge nationwide.

History
Panama has been the Independent Republic and a Sovereign State since it was separated from Colombia in 1903. Its first president, Dr. Manuel Amador Guerrero, under pressure from the United States consul and the commercial bourgeoisie, ended up dissolving the national army and handing over its weapons to the North American army. With the few officers remaining on active duty, he formed a Military Police Corps with limited capability. Crises like the Coto War (which lasted about 13–14 days) in 1921 illustrated the weakness of the resulting Corps. During the conflict, patriotic volunteers bolstered these troops in defense of the territory, but Panama was eventually forced to evacuate the Coto District.

Through Law 20 of September 29, 1923, the bases of the organization and operation of the Defense Forces of the Republic of Panama were created.

On January 2, 1955, Remón Cantera was assassinated within the framework of a political conspiracy, and General Bolívar Vallarino was appointed as Chief of the National Guard.

In 1935, Colonel Manuel Pino restructured the National Police totally, providing a budget and a more stable internal framework. To improve morale, he also conferred a mystique on the men who made up the units.

On October 11, 1968, the National Guard staged a coup d'etat against the newly established government of Dr. Arnulfo Arias Madrid, and Colonel Aristides M. Hassán was appointed Commander in Chief. Then, General Omar Torrijos Herrera, as Head of State, assumes command. Torrijos died in a plane crash on the Marta de Coclé hill on July 31, 1981. He is succeeded by Colonel Florencio Flórez Aguilar, General Rubén Darío Paredes Del Río, and General Manuel Antonio Noriega Moreno.

As a result of the North American invasion of December 20, 1989, the new government organized the Panamanian State Public Force, with the mission of protecting the life, honor, and property of nationals wherever they are and of foreigners under the jurisdiction of its territory. Colonel Roberto Armijo was appointed to the position of police chief.

The great world economic crisis of 1932 caused a series of disorders in public and private life in Panama, reducing the police force to just 200 members. This made their barracks vulnerable to looting, and their files were destroyed by groups led by some politicians.

In 1947 Colonel José Antonio Remón Cantera assumed leadership of the National Police. In 1952, he became President of the Republic following a coup d'etat against Daniel Chanis Pinzón. In 1903, Law No. 44 was promulgated, changing the National Police into the National Guard. This act contained a plan for modernization and greater professionalism for its officers, sending numerous officers to train abroad.

Commissioner Jorge Miranda Molina, assumed the position as Director General of the National Police, on July 4, 2019, in the first simultaneous change of command ceremony chaired by the President of the Republic, Laurentino Cortizo Cohen. He will serve until 2024.

Structure 

The Panamanian National Police are structured para-militarily. Police stations are present in every district, and the country as a whole is divided into Zonas Policiales (Police Zones) major city or province.

Sworn offices consist of the following ranks:
Commissioned officer ranks

Other ranks

Equipment

Vehicles 

The police in Panama have numerous vehicles at their disposal. The police vehicles recently changed color from white with blue trim to a navy blue with white trim.

References

 

Government of Panama
Law enforcement in Panama